Alain crosnieri is a species of crab in the family Pinnotheridae, and was first described in 1998 by Raymond Manning. This crab is  found in Indonesian territorial waters.

References

Pinnotheroidea
Taxa named by Raymond B. Manning
Crustaceans described in 1998